Nepenthes × kuchingensis  is a natural hybrid between N. ampullaria and N. mirabilis. Although it is named after the city of Kuching in Sarawak, this plant has a wide distribution across Borneo, New Guinea, Peninsular Malaysia, Sumatra, and Thailand.

References

  Akhriadi, P. 2007. Kajian taksonomi hibrid alami Nepenthes (Nepenthaceae) di Kerinci. Working paper, Andalas University, Padang. Abstract 
 Clarke, C.M. & C.C. Lee 2004. Pitcher Plants of Sarawak. Natural History Publications (Borneo), Kota Kinabalu.
  Enjelina, W. 2012. Analisis hibrid alam kantung semar (Nepenthes) di Bukit Taratak Kabupaten Pesisir Selatan Sumatera Barat dengan teknik RAPD. M.Sc. thesis, Andalas University, Padang. 
  Mansur, M. 2007. Keanekaragaman jenis Nepenthes (kantong semar) dataran rendah di Kalimantan Tengah. [Diversity of lowland Nepenthes (kantong semar) in Central Kalimantan.] Berita Biologi 8(5): 335–341. Abstract
  Srirahayu 2010. Kajian fertilitas hibrid alami pada populasi Nepenthes di Bukit Taratak, Kenagarian Surantih, Kecamatan Sutera, Kabupaten Pesisir Selatan. Thesis, Andalas University, Padang. Abstract 

Carnivorous plants of Asia
kuchingensis
Flora of Borneo
Flora of Malaya
Flora of New Guinea
Flora of Sumatra
Flora of Thailand